MoD Boscombe Down  is the home of a military aircraft testing site, on the southeastern outskirts of the town of Amesbury, Wiltshire, England. The site is managed by QinetiQ, the private defence company created as part of the breakup of the Defence Evaluation and Research Agency (DERA) in 2001 by the UK Ministry of Defence (MoD).

The base was originally conceived, constructed, and operated as Royal Air Force Boscombe Down, more commonly known as RAF Boscombe Down, and since 1939, has evaluated aircraft for use by the British Armed Forces. The airfield has two runways, one  in length, and the second . The airfield's evaluation centre is currently home to Rotary Wing Test and Evaluation Squadron (RWTS), Fast Jet Test Squadron (FJTS), Heavy Aircraft Test Squadron (HATS), Handling Squadron, and the Empire Test Pilots' School (ETPS).

History

First World War
An aerodrome opened at the Boscombe Down site in October 1917 and operated as a Royal Flying Corps Training Depot Station. Known as Royal Flying Corps Station Red House Farm, it trained aircrews for operational roles in France during the First World War. Between opening and early 1919 the station accommodated No. 6 Training Depot, No. 11 Training Depot and No. 14 Training Depot. When the United States entered the war in April 1917, the Royal Flying Corps began training groundcrew and aircrew of Aviation Section of the US Army at the airfield. During 1918 the 166th Aero Squadron and 188th Aero Squadron were present. At the end of the war in November 1918, the airfield became an aircraft storage unit until 1920 when it closed and the site returned to agricultural use.

Inter-war period
In 1930 the site reopened as Royal Air Force Boscombe Down, a bomber station in the Air Defence of Great Britain command, the fore-runner of RAF Fighter Command. The first unit to operate from the new airfield was No. 9 Squadron which started operating the Vickers Virginia heavy bomber on 26 February 1930. A second Virginia unit, No. 10 Squadron, arrived on 1 April 1931 and also operated the Handley Page Heyford.

The following RAF squadrons were based at Boscombe Down between 1930 and 1939:
 No. 9 Squadron RAF; between 1930 and 1935, with the Vickers Virginia;
 No. 10 Squadron RAF; between 1931 and 1937, with the Virginia
 No. 51 Squadron RAF; between 1937 and 1938, with the Virginia, Avro Anson, and the Armstrong Whitworth Whitley;
 No. 58 Squadron RAF; between 1937 and 1938, with the Anson, and the Whitley;
 No. 78 Squadron RAF; between 1936 and 1937, with the Heyford;
 No. 88 Squadron RAF; between 1937 and 1939, with the Hawker Hind, and the Fairey Battle;
 No. 97 Squadron RAF; between 1935 and 1937, with the Heyford;
 No. 150 Squadron RAF; between 1938 and 1939, with the Battle;
 No. 166 Squadron RAF; between 1936 and 1937, with the Heyford;
 No. 214 Squadron RAF; between 1935 and 1935, with the Virginia;
 No. 217 Squadron RAF; between 1937 and 1937, with the Anson;
 No. 218 Squadron RAF; between 1938 and 1939, with the Battle;
 No. 224 Squadron RAF; between 1937 and 1937, with the Anson.

Second World War

The Aeroplane and Armament Experimental Establishment (A&AEE) arrived from RAF Martlesham Heath, Suffolk, on 9 September 1939, shortly after the outbreak of the Second World War. The move marked the beginning of A&AEE Boscombe Down and aircraft research and testing at the station, a role which it has retained into the 21st century. About fifty aircraft and military and civilian personnel had arrived by mid-September 1939. The necessary facilities required for the specialist work carried out by the A&AEE were lacking at Boscombe Down, and its expansion resulted in many temporary buildings being constructed at the station in an unplanned manner.
 No. 35 Squadron RAF; during 1940, with the Handley Page Halifax I;
 No. 56 Squadron RAF; during 1940, with the Hawker Hurricane I;
 No. 109 Squadron RAF; between 1940 and 1942, with the Whitley, Anson, and Vickers Wellington;
 No. 249 Squadron RAF; during 1940, with the Hurricane.
Throughout the war, the airfield continued to have only grass runways and remained within its pre-war boundaries.

Cold War 
Boscombe was used to test and evaluate many aircraft flown by the British Armed Forces during the Cold War. First flights of notable aircraft include the English Electric P 1, forerunner of the English Electric Lightning, the Folland Gnat and Midge, Hawker P.1067 (the prototype Hunter), Westland Wyvern, and the BAC TSR.2. Part of the base was also used by the RAF School of Aviation Medicine.

The first hard-surface runway opened in October 1945 and was followed by two more runways with parallel taxiways to create the present-day layout. The runways extend into Idmiston and Allington parishes.

Aviation trial and evaluation centre 

With the end of the Cold War, the site was renamed the Aircraft and Armament Evaluation Establishment (AAEE) in 1992. All experimental work was moved to the Defence Research Agency (DRA). Responsibility for the site passed from the MoD Procurement Executive to the Defence Test and Evaluation Organisation (DTEO) in 1993, which was amalgamated into the Defence Evaluation and Research Agency (DERA) in 1995.

During this period, the station may have been involved in assisting the United States with its black projects. On 26 September 1994, after an aircraft crashed on landing due to a nosewheel collapse, a USAF C5 Galaxy was redirected to the station.  It is speculated that the crashed plane was an Aurora, a hypersonic spy plane. Whatever it was, it was disassembled and returned to the US by the C5 Galaxy. Both the British and American Governments have refused to comment on the incident.

21st century 
Following the creation of QinetiQ in 2001, a 25-year Long Term Partnering Agreement (LTPA) was established with the MoD, covering 16 sites including Boscombe Down. Under the agreement, Boscombe Down remains a government military airfield, but is operated by QinetiQ on behalf of the MoD. The Joint Test and Evaluation Group (JTEG) was established under the control of RAF Air Command, and together with QinetiQ, forms the Air Test and Evaluation Centre (ATEC).

From 1 May 2007, Boscombe Down became the home of the Joint Aircraft Recovery and Transportation Squadron (JARTS) which was combined from the two Royal Navy and Royal Air Force elements who were responsible for aircraft moves and post-crash management.

In October 2007, it was announced that RAF Boscombe Down would become a Quick Reaction Alert (QRA) airfield from early 2008, offering round-the-clock fighter coverage for the South and South West of UK airspace.

In April 2022, the RAF Centre of Aviation Medicine retired its two BAE Systems Hawk T1 which were based at Boscombe Down. The aircraft were used for trials by the centre's Aviation Medicine Flight. The flight moved to RAF Scampton to continue its work using Hawks operated by the Red Arrows.

Past units 
The Heavy Aircraft Test Squadron (HATS) at RAF Boscombe Down was responsible for the flight testing of heavy aircraft (multi-engine types). The department subsequently became known as Fixed Wing Test Squadron (FWTS); however, during the late 1980s, the title once more changed to that of the Heavy Aircraft Test Squadron.

The following units were located at the base at some point:

 No. 4 Group Experimental Flight
 No. 6 Training Depot Station
 No. 11 Training Depot Station
 No. 13 Joint Services Trials Unit
 No. 22 Joint Services Trials Unit
 No. 29 Joint Services Trials Unit
 No. 42 Squadron RAF
 No. 75 (Bomber) Wing RAF
 819 Naval Air Squadron
 893 Naval Air Squadron
 899 Naval Air Squadron
 No. 2780 Squadron RAF Regiment
 No. 2786 Squadron RAF Regiment
 Aeroplane and Armament Experimental Establishment
 Aircraft and Armament Evaluation Establishment RAF became Test and Evaluation Centre

 Aircraft Gun Mounting Establishment RAF
 Assessment and Evaluation Centre RAF
 Blind Approach Training and Development Unit RAF became Wireless (Intelligence) Development Unit RAF
 Bomber Development Unit RAF
 Bustard Flying Club
 Handling Flight RAF became Handling Squadron RAF
 High Altitude Flight (A&AEE)
 Intensive Flying Development Flight RAF
 Intensive Flying Development Unit
 Meteorological Research Flight RAF became Meteorological Research Unit RAF
 RAF Centre of Aviation Medicine Flight
 Special Duties Flight RAF
 Strike Attack Operational Evaluation Unit (SAOEU)
 Tornado Operational Evaluation Unit RAF

Based units 

The following flying and non-flying units are based at MOD Boscombe Down.

Royal Air Force 
No. 1 Group (Air Combat) RAF

 Air and Space Warfare Centre
 Air Test and Evaluation Centre (operated in partnership with QinetiQ) – DA42 Twin Star, JAS 39 Gripen, PC-21, G120TP, RJ70, RJ100
 Empire Test Pilots School – DA42 Twin Star, JAS 39 Gripen, PC-21, G120TP, RJ70, RJ100
 Rotary Wing Test and Evaluation Squadron (RWTES) – A109E Power, Bell 412 and H125
744 Naval Air Squadron – Merlin HM2 and Chinook HC5/6

No. 2 Group (Air Combat Support) RAF

 Support Force
 No. 42 (Expeditionary Support) Wing
 Joint Aircraft Recovery and Transportation Squadron

No. 22 Group (Training) RAF
 No. 6 Flying Training School
 Bristol University Air Squadron – Grob Tutor T1
Southampton University Air Squadron – Grob Tutor T1
No. 2 Air Experience Flight – Grob Tutor T1

See also 

 List of aerospace flight test centres
 List of Royal Air Force stations

References

Citations

Bibliography

External links

 
 MOD Boscombe Down – Long Term Partnering Agreement website
 UK Military Aeronautical Information Publication – Boscombe Down (EGDM)

Airports in England
Amesbury
Buildings and structures in Wiltshire
Installations of the Ministry of Defence (United Kingdom)
Qinetiq
Research institutes in Wiltshire